Lucas Barcellos Damasceno (born 19 July 1998) is a Brazilian footballer who plays for CSA, on loan from Fluminense, as a forward.

Career statistics

Club

References

1998 births
Living people
Footballers from Rio de Janeiro (city)
Brazilian footballers
Association football forwards
Campeonato Brasileiro Série B players
Fluminense FC players
Figueirense FC players
Associação Desportiva Confiança players
Centro Sportivo Alagoano players